Yaca may refer to:
yaca, the concept of a namesake in Fijian tradition
 yacA, a gene

See also 
 Yacas, a computer algebra system
 Yacca (disambiguation)
 Yacka (disambiguation)
 Yaka (disambiguation)
 IACA (disambiguation)